Richard Devenish Pearsall (15 January 1921 – 2013) was an English cricketer who played first-class cricket for Cambridge University in 1947 and 1948.

Pearsall attended Oundle School and King's College, Cambridge. A medium-pace bowler and lower-order batsman, he played several matches in two seasons after the war for Cambridge University without gaining a Blue. His best bowling figures were 4 for 51 against Free Foresters in 1947, and his highest score was 80 not out against Middlesex in 1948, when he and Barry Pryer added an unbeaten 149 in 90 minutes for the ninth wicket.

References

External links
 
 Richard Pearsall at CricketArchive

1921 births
2013 deaths
People from Kenilworth
People educated at Oundle School
Alumni of the University of Cambridge
English cricketers
Cambridge University cricketers